Dr. Johan N. Lundström (born 1973) is a Swedish biologist and psychologist.

He was awarded his Ph.D. in 2005 from Uppsala University and is most notable for his chemosensory work, and currently works at the Monell Chemical Senses Center. His experiments involve the use of neuroimaging and testing of human behavior.

References

External links
 Dr. Lundström's page on the Monell website

1973 births
Living people
Swedish biologists
Swedish psychologists
Uppsala University alumni
Karolinska Institute